Clough State Park is a public recreation area on the east side of Everett Lake, a  reservoir formed by a dam on the Piscataquog River, in Weare, New Hampshire. The state park has a  sandy beach, playing fields, and picnic area and offers opportunities for swimming, hiking, fishing, picnicking, and non-motorized boating.

References

External links
Clough State Park New Hampshire Department of Natural and Cultural Resources

State parks of New Hampshire
Parks in Hillsborough County, New Hampshire
Weare, New Hampshire
Protected areas established in 1964
1964 establishments in New Hampshire